Samuel Groth and Chris Guccione were the defending champions, but Guccione did not participate. Groth partnered with Ryan Harrison, but they withdrew in the semifinals.

Matthew Ebden and Wang Chieh-fu won the title, defeating Sanchai and Sonchat Ratiwatana, 6–1, 6–4.

Seeds

Draw

References
 Main Draw

Santaizi ATP Challenger - Doubles
2015 Doubles